Ashwaq Moharram is a Yemeni physician and activist, noted for her work dealing with starvation in the Yemeni city of Hudaydah.

Life
Moharram is married with 2 children. In 2016 after working as a doctor for twenty years she was named one of the BBC 100 Women for her achievements. She was then living alone in Humaydah as her husband had taken their children to Jordan. Moharram has said of her work: "I'm seeing the same thing I used to watch on TV when the famine unfolded in Somalia. I never thought I would see this in Yemen." Moharram has worked for numerous international aid organisations, but since 2015 has worked independently, delivering medicine and food in her car, serving as a mobile clinic.

References

Yemeni physicians
Living people
Yemeni activists
Yemeni women activists
BBC 100 Women
20th-century Yemeni women
20th-century Yemeni people
21st-century Yemeni women
21st-century Yemeni people
1970s births